A bee is a flying insect.

Bee, BEE or The Bee may also refer to:

Places

United States 
 Bee, Kentucky, an unincorporated community
 Bee, Minnesota, an unincorporated community
 Bee, Nebraska, a village
 Bee Cliff (Tennessee)
 Bee County, Texas
 Bee, Virginia, an unincorporated community
 Bee, Washington, an unincorporated community

Elsewhere
 Bee, New South Wales, Australia, a parish
 Bee, Piedmont, Italy, a commune

Fictional characters
 Aunt Bee, in the television series The Andy Griffith Show
 Mr. Weatherbee, nicknamed "the Bee", the high school principal in Archie Comics
 Bumblebee (Transformers) or Bee
 Bee, in the Quiz Kids magazines
 Bee, in the animated television series WordWorld
 Bee, the titular character in The Babysitter
 Bee, one of the titular characters in Bee and PuppyCat

Media
 List of newspapers named Bee
 Bee Group Newspapers, New York
 The Babylon Bee, a satire site
 The Bee (magazine), a literary magazine issued only during 1759
 The Bee (weekly), a publication of James Anderson of Hermiston started in 1791 
 The Bee (radio station), a local radio station in Lancashire, England
 Bee Broadcasting, Inc., a radio broadcasting company based in Kalispell, Montana

Music
 Bee (EP) by Tracy Bonham 
 "Bee" (song), recorded by both Lena Meyer-Landrut and Jennifer Braun

Vehicles
 Bee (ship), a ship that sank off the coast of Australia in 1806
 Daihatsu Bee, a Japanese three-wheeled car
 Sopwith Bee, a small biplane built in 1916 as a personal aircraft

People
 Bee (surname)
 Bee (given name)
 B. E. E., a pen name used by E. E. Brown (1847–?), American author

Acronym
 Basal energy expenditure
 BEE Japan or Bicycle for Everyone's Earth
 Black Economic Empowerment, a South African government program
 Bureau of Energy Efficiency, India

Other uses
 Bee (gathering), a gathering of people for work or competition
 , three vessels and two shore establishments of the Royal Navy
 Bee (hieroglyph), an Egyptian language hieroglyph
 Bee (mythology)
 Bee Building, Omaha, Nebraska, torn down in 1966
 Bee Playing Cards
 Air Bee, a short-lived airline based in Rome
 .218 Bee, a .22 caliber rifle cartridge
 .17 Ackley Bee, a rifle cartridge
 An-Nahl (The Bee), the 16th sūrah of the Qur'an
 Flybe (1979–2020)'s ICAO code
 Byangsi language's ISO 639-3 code

See also
 Saint Bee (disambiguation)
 The Bees (disambiguation)
 Book of the Bee, a 13th-century compilation containing numerous Bible legends
 Bee Movie, a 2007 American computer-animated comedy film directed by Simon J. Smith and Steve Hickner
 Bee Bee Bee (born 1969), an American thoroughbred horse
 Bees Nursery, later Bees Ltd, a company formed by Arthur Bulley
 Spelling bee
 Be (disambiguation)
 Bea (disambiguation)